The Papyrus Platform is a software platform for business communication and process management, developed by Austrian software vendor ISIS Papyrus. It includes Adaptive Case Management (ACM), Enterprise Content Management (ECM), Business Process Management (BPM), Business Rules Management (BRM), and operational Business Intelligence (BI).

Built on its Papyrus Objects integration architecture with a meta-object model, SOA-compatible and general messaging interfaces, and a freely definable user interface it is used to create composite knowledge applications with front- and back-office collaboration. Based on the proprietary Papyrus Query Language (PQL) it fully implements the Content Management Interoperability Services (CMIS) standard as defined by OASIS, of which ISIS Papyrus is a foundational sponsor.

An evaluation conducted at the Technical University of Vienna assessed the agility of making changes to processes, reduced process cycle times and the provision of operational decision support among the strong points of a state-based process management approach.

References

External links

Content management systems
Customer communications management